"Crossroads" is a song by American singer Tracy Chapman. It was released in 1989 as the lead single from her second studio album Crossroads. The song was written by Chapman, and produced by David Kershenbaum and Chapman. "Crossroads" reached No. 90 on the Billboard Hot 100. The song's music video was directed by Matt Mahurin.

Reception
On its release as a single, Tim Southwell of Record Mirror wrote, "'Crossroads' sees Tracy in familiar sombre mood, reflecting on life's struggles and the pain of it all. It may not be frothy but Chapman's cool vibes are always welcome." Sian Pattenden of Smash Hits described the song as "very much the kind of folksy, sombre song you'd expect from Tracy". She added, "If you liked "Fast Car" then you'll like this because it's jolly similar."

In a review of Crossroads, Fred Goodman of Rolling Stone noted the song's "rich arrangement and heartfelt delivery" and added, "'Crossroads' breaks little new ground for Chapman musically, but its subtly shaded percussion, pizzicato violin and lilting accordion give new muscle to Chapman's previously bareboned presentation." Steve Morse of The Boston Globe felt the song "opens the album in a startling confessional manner".

Parry Gettelman of The Orlando Sentinel considered the song to "proclaim [Chapman's] independence from materialism and money-changers who beset her." Brian Springer of The Daily Tar Heel wrote, "The title track adds the only new lyrical wrinkle [on the album], with Chapman making the usual star complaint of having to deal with all the attention. Accordion and violin pizzicato give this song a slightly different flavor than the previous album."

Track listing
7" single
"Crossroads" - 4:11
"Born to Fight" - 2:46

12" single
"Crossroads" - 4:11
"Born to Fight" - 2:46
"Mountains O'Things" (Live) - 5:05

12" single (UK release)
"Crossroads" - 4:11
"Born to Fight" - 2:46
"Fast Car" - 4:57

Cassette single
"Crossroads" - 4:11
"Born to Fight" - 2:46

CD single (German release)
"Crossroads" - 4:11
"Born to Fight" - 2:46
"Mountains O'Things" (Live) - 5:05

CD single (US promo)
"Crossroads" - 4:11

Personnel
Crossroads
 Tracy Chapman - vocals, acoustic guitar
 G. E. Smith - acoustic picking guitar
 Frank Marocco - accordion
 Charlie Bisharat - violin
 Bob Marlette - keyboards
 Larry Klein - bass
 Denny Fongheiser - drums
 Bobbye Hall - percussion

Born to Fight
 Tracy Chapman - vocals, acoustic guitar
 Jack Holder - acoustic piano
 Snooky Young - trumpet
 Tim Landers - bass
 Denny Fongheiser - drums
 Bobbye Hall - tambourine

Production
 David Kershenbaum, Tracy Chapman - producers
 Kevin W. Smith - engineer, mixing
 John X Volaitis - additional engineer
 Marty Lester - assistant engineer, assistant mixer
 Bob Ludwig - mastering
 Claude Nobs - producer on "Mountains O'Things"
 David Richards - engineer on "Mountains O'Things"

Charts

References

1989 songs
1989 singles
Tracy Chapman songs
Elektra Records singles
Song recordings produced by David Kershenbaum
Songs written by Tracy Chapman